Tanomastat is a matrix metalloproteinase inhibitor (MMPI).

Excision of malignant tumors comprises first line treatment for cancer of solid tissues. This procedure not infrequently misses small fragments of the tumor that may have broken off before surgery from the principal site of the disease. These fragments, metastases, often proliferate at quite remote locations where they cause much of the pathology of cancer. A series of proteolytic enzymes present in tumor cells, known as matrix metalloproteinases, help establish growth of these metastases at the newly invaded sites; these proteases are also involved in the formation of new blood vessels that will nourish the invasive cell masses. Consequently, considerable research has been devoted to matrix metalloproteinases as a target for anticancer drugs. Clinical results with these
compounds have to date produced equivocal results.

See also
 Batimastat
 Marimastat

References

Chloroarenes
Ketones
Matrix metalloproteinase inhibitors
Thioethers